Luna 1, also known as Mechta (lit.: Dream), E-1 No.4 and First Lunar Rover,  was the first spacecraft to reach the vicinity of Earth's Moon, and the first spacecraft to be placed in heliocentric orbit. Intended as an impactor, Luna 1 was launched as part of the Soviet Luna programme in 1959.

A malfunction in the ground-based control system caused an error in the upper stage rocket's burn time, and the spacecraft missed the Moon by 5900 km (more than three times the Moon's radius). Luna 1 became the first human-made object to reach heliocentric orbit and was dubbed "Artificial Planet 1" and renamed Mechta (Dream). Luna 1 was also referred to as the "First Cosmic Ship", in reference to its achievement of Earth escape velocity.

Background

Luna 1 was the fourth and final spacecraft of the Ye-1 spacecraft series. The previous three iterations did not achieve orbit due to issues with each rocket launch.

Spacecraft

The satellite and rocket carrying Luna 1 was originally referred to as the Soviet Space Rocket by the Soviet Press. Pravda writer Alexander Kazantsev called it Mechta (meaning 'dream'). Citizens of Moscow unofficially deemed it Lunik, a combination of Luna (Moon) and Sputnik. It was renamed to Luna 1 in 1963.

The spherical satellite was powered by mercury-oxide batteries and silver-zinc accumulators. There were five antenna on one hemisphere, four whip-style and one rigid, for communication purposes. The spacecraft also contained radio equipment including a tracking transmitter and telemetry system. There was no propulsion system.

Luna 1 was designed to impact the Moon, delivering two metallic pennants with the Soviet coat of arms that were included into its payload package. It also had six instruments to study the Moon upon its suicidal approach. The flux-gate magnetometer was triaxial and could measure ± 3000 gammas. It was designed to detect lunar magnetic fields. Two micrometeorite detectors, developed by Tatiana Nazarova of the Vernadsky Institute, were installed on the spacecraft. They each consisted of a metal plate with springs and could detect small impacts. Four ion traps, used to measure solar wind and plasma, were included. They were developed by Konstantin Gringauz. The scientific payload also included two gas-discharge Geiger counters, a sodium-iodide scintillation counter, and a Cherenkov detector.

Launch

Luna 1 was launched at 16:41 GMT (22:41 local time) on 2 January 1959 from Site 1/5 at the Baikonur Cosmodrome by a Luna 8K72 rocket. The first three stages operated nominally. The Soviet engineers did not trust automated systems for controlling the engine burns, so they communicated to the rocket via radio. The signal to stop firing the engine Block E stage was sent too late, and it imparted an extra 175 m/s to Luna 1. The spacecraft passed within  of the Moon's surface on 4 January after 34 hours of flight, and became the first man made object to leave earth's orbit on January 6. The batteries were designed for a minimum of 40 hours but lasted for 62.

Luna 1 became the first artificial object to reach the escape velocity of the Earth, along with its carrier rocket's  upper stage, which it separated from after being the first spacecraft to reach heliocentric orbit. It remains in orbit around the Sun, between the orbits of Earth and Mars.

Experiment results
The cloud was released for two purposes: to allow visual tracking of the spacecraft's trajectory and to observe the behavior of gas in space. This glowing orange trail of gas, visible over the Indian Ocean with the brightness of a sixth-magnitude star for a few minutes, was photographed by Mstislav Gnevyshev at the Mountain Station of the Main Astronomical Observatory of the Academy of Sciences of the USSR near Kislovodsk.

While traveling through the outer Van Allen radiation belt, the spacecraft's scintillator made observations indicating that a small number of high-energy particles exist in the outer belt. The measurements obtained during this mission provided new data on the Earth's radiation belt and outer space. The craft was unable to detect a lunar magnetic field which placed an upper limit on its strength of 1/10,000th of Earth's. The first-ever direct observations and measurements of solar wind, a strong flow of ionized plasma emanating from the Sun and streaming through interplanetary space, were performed. The ionized plasma concentration was measured to be some 700 particles per cm3 at altitudes of 20,000–25,000 km and 300 to 400 particles per cm3 at altitudes of 100,000–150,000 km. The spacecraft also marked the first instance of radio communication at the half-million-kilometer distance.

Reaction 

Some doubted the veracity of the Soviets' claim of mission success. Lloyd Mallan wrote about it in a book called The Big Red Lie. Many in the West did not receive transmissions from the spacecraft even though the Soviets publicized them before the flight. In May 1959 several hearings  Soviet Space Technology before the Committee on Science and Astronautics and Special Subcommittee on Lunik Probe of the United States House of Representatives attested the achievements of the Soviet mission and its sophicated guidance technology.

The Soviet Union issued stamps to commemorate their success.

Subsequent missions

Luna 2, the second spacecraft of the Ye-1A series, successfully completed the mission on 13 September 1959.

See also

 Pioneer 4 – a similar NASA mission launched 3 March 1959, two months after Luna 1.

References

External links
 
 
 
 
 
 

 Boris Chertok, "Rakety i liudi: goriachie dni, kholodnoy voyny", Moscow, "Mashinostroenie", 2nd edition (1999). Sect. 2–7.
 Zarya – Luna 1 chronology

1959 in the Soviet Union
Derelict satellites in heliocentric orbit
Luna programme
Spacecraft launched in 1959